Bottome is a surname. Notable people with the surname include:

Margaret McDonald Bottome (1827–1906), American reformer, organizational founder, author
Peter Bottome (1937–2016), Venezuelan businessman
Phyllis Bottome (1884–1963), British writer

See also
Bottom (disambiguation)